The Last Exploits of the Olsen Gang  is a 1974 Danish comedy film directed by Erik Balling and starring Ove Sprogøe, Morten Grunwald, Poul Bundgaard and Kirsten Walther. This was the sixth film in the Olsen Gang-series, and at the time of production it was meant to be the last. It was selected as the Danish entry for the Best Foreign Language Film at the 47th Academy Awards, but was not accepted as a nominee.

Plot
After last robbery, Olsen Gang went to Majorca, but without any money, as Benny and Kjeld accidentally threw loot to the garbage bin. Egon breaks to the local restaurant to get back on track with the finances, but on his dismay he's caught and whole gang returns to Denmark. After some time Egon is released; Kjeld and Benny are waiting for him but Egon abandons them: He has been hired by Stock Broker Holm Hansen to open a safe in Switzerland belonging to his deceased associate.

Egon demands 25% of the value equivalent of the contents of the safe as payment for his work. Holm Hansen agree, but has his Swiss henchman double-cross Egon once the safe is open and leave him at the mercy of the Swiss police. Egon escapes though, and makes it back to Denmark, where he reunites with Benny and Kjeld with a new plan to exact revenge and claim his payment. The safe held the Bedford Diamonds, an extremely valuable collection of jewelry, much sought-after as an inflation-proof investment for cash and wanted by police all over the world.

Holm Hansen sells the diamonds to an Arabian Oil Sheikh for 15 million dollars. Using a boat, a bus and one hundred balloons, the Gang manage to snatch the diamonds under the very nose of the Sheikh and his police escort. Egon, knowing that the diamonds cannot legally be sold, plan instead to use them to extort 50% of the 15 million from Holm Hansen, but is foiled by Yvonne, who has hidden the diamonds and replaced them with worthless souvenirs. Holm Hansen concludes that Egon is raving mad, but far too knowledgeable about his businesses and orders his henchman "Bøffen" to make Egon "disappear and stay gone forever".

Bøffen captures Egon and attempts to drown him in the Copenhagen harbor, but Egon is saved in the nick of time by Benny and Kjeld. Egon how has a final plan. With Benny and Kjeld disguised as police officers and Egon playing captive, the Gang confronts Holm Hansen. With Holm Hansen distracted by Benny, Egon and Kjeld open his safe and replace the 15 million dollars with the diamonds. Realizing he has been played, Holm Hansen calls the real police, which promptly arrest him on finding the Bedford Diamonds in his possession. The Gang subsequently escapes to Majorca with the money.

Cast
 Ove Sprogøe – Egon Olsen
 Morten Grunwald – Benny Frandsen
 Poul Bundgaard – Kjeld Jensen
 Bjørn Watt-Boolsen – John Morgan Rockefeller Holm Hansen, Jr.
 Jes Holtsø – Børge Jensen
 Kirsten Walther – Yvonne Jensen
 Axel Strøbye – Kriminalassistent Jensen
 Ole Ernst – Politiassistent Holm
 Ove Verner Hansen – Bøffen

See also
 List of submissions to the 47th Academy Awards for Best Foreign Language Film
 List of Danish submissions for the Academy Award for Best Foreign Language Film

References

External links
 
 

1974 films
1970s crime comedy films
1970s Danish-language films
Films directed by Erik Balling
Films with screenplays by Erik Balling
1970s heist films
Olsen-banden films
1974 comedy films